Punto Fijo (from Spanish: Fixed Point; also transcribed as "Axis mundi") is the second studio album by Slovak  vocalist Szidi Tobias released on BMG Ariola in 2003.

Track listing 

Notes
 Tracks performed by featured artists includes no vocal contribution by Tobias herself.

Credits and personnel

 Szidi Tobias - lead vocal
 Milan Vyskočáni - music, lead vocal

 Peter Lipovský - lyrics, lead vocal
 Ivana Chýlková - lead vocal

References

General
 
 
Specific

External links 
 SzidiTobias.cz > Discography > Punto Fijo

2003 albums
Szidi Tobias albums